was a Japanese professional sumo wrestler from Narashino, Shimōsa. He made his debut in May 1887 and wrestled for Miyagino stable. He reached the makuuchi division in January 1893 and reached the rank of ōzeki in 1897. He retired in May, 1903 and died in May, 1907.

Career

Early career
He joined Miyagino stable because the then head coach (Miyagino Umagoro) was from Makuhari, Chiba District and made his professional debut in May 1886 under the shikona . It is thought that his first shikona was chosen to pay homage to his hometown shrine of Kikuta. Upon promotion to juryō, in June 1892, he was given the shikona . He reached the top makuuchi division in January 1893 after only one tournament in juryō. After three years in maegashira, he was promoted to sekiwake in May 1896. After his sanyaku debut, Hōō was immediately promoted to ōzeki in January 1897. His years as a top division wrestler were marked by his strong rivalry with yokozuna Konishiki and then sekiwake Asashio.

Ōzeki career and yokozuna hopes
In 1898, Hōō scored his best record with seven wins and two draws (this was his fourth tournament in makuuchi). He was at the peak of his career and was being presented as a future yokozuna. However, due to heavy drinking problems, Hōō was denied the rank after the May, 1898 tournament and dropped back to maegashira in 1902. However it failed and Hōō retired during the 1903's May tournament.

Retirement from sumo

Toshiyori career
Hōō Umagorō became a coach in 1894. During that period he took the name of his former master, changing his name to Umagoro, and taking his late master's title of Miyagino. He became an active oyakata while still competing in the makuuchi division. After his retirement, he was a popular master who was well received by younger generations, among whom he recruited future yokozuna Ōtori, to whom he bestowed his old shikona. In the Association, he notably served as shimpan but resigned due to his poor health. He later developed spinal cord disease and passed away at the young age of 40, in 1907.

Trivia
In 1974, Nishonoseki stable wrestler Hōō Tomomichi took the Hōō shikona.

Top division record

See also

Glossary of sumo terms
List of past sumo wrestlers
List of ōzeki

References

1866 births
Japanese sumo wrestlers
Sumo people from Chiba Prefecture
Ōzeki
1907 deaths